There Is No Enemy is the seventh full-length studio album by indie rock band Built to Spill (their fifth on Warner Bros. Records).  The album was released in the US on October 6, 2009, and is the last to feature long-time drummer Scott Plouf and bassist Brett Nelson, who left the group in 2012. It features guest musicians Sam Coomes, cellist John McMahon, Scott Schmaljohn (of Treepeople), Paul Leary, and additional keyboards by Roger Manning.

On September 30, 2009, the band streamed the full album on their official MySpace profile.

On February 15, 2010, ATP Recordings released the album in the UK and Europe with the exclusive, previously unreleased bonus track "Water Sleepers".

Track listing
All songs written by Built To Spill with "some words by Karena Youtz."
"Aisle 13" - 3:17
"Hindsight" - 3:38
"Nowhere Lullaby" - 3:59
"Good Ol' Boredom" - 6:31
"Life's a Dream" - 4:53
"Oh Yeah" - 5:21
"Pat" - 2:40
"Done" - 6:53
"Planting Seeds" - 4:26
"Things Fall Apart" - 6:15
"Tomorrow" - 7:40

Musician

Built To Spill
Doug Martsch - vocals, guitar
Brett Nelson - bass guitar
Brett Netson - guitar
Scott Plouf - drums
Jim Roth - guitar

others
John McMahon - cello, lap steel (on track #3)
Paul Leary - guitar (#6) 
Scott Schmaljohn - guitar (#7)
Sam Coomes - mellotron, organ (#8)
Danny Levin - horns (#10)
Roger Manning - organ (#10,11)

References

2009 albums
Built to Spill albums
Warner Records albums
ATP Recordings albums